Social ontology is a domain-specific branch of ontology (philosophy) which studies the nature and properties of the social world. Social ontology deals with examining the various entities in the world arising from social interaction.

Notable contemporary philosophers who study social ontology include Margaret Gilbert, Amie Thomasson, and Ruth Millikan.

Definition
General ontology has a number of subfields, domain-specific or regional ontologies. Social ontology is such a domain-specific subfield, which should include the basic entities, properties and kinds studied by the social sciences. There are two kinds of social entities: social individuals and social complexes or collectives.

According to Lynne Rudder Baker, taking “social community” as a primitive, we can characterize a social property as a property the instantiation of which requires the existence of a social community. Typically, for human beings that means a linguistic community. Social ontology at a time t contains all the instantiated social properties that are irreducible and ineliminable at that time. This will comprise the social properties that are primary kinds that are instantiated at t and the entities (individual or complex) that have those social properties as their primary-kind properties.

References

External links 

 Social ontology in the Stanford Encyclopedia of Philosophy

social ontology
ontology
Philosophy of social science